Made in London is the third studio album by Italian singer Noemi, released on 20 February 2014.
The album was launched during the 64th Sanremo Music Festival. Noemi performed the songs "Un uomo è un albero" and "Bagnati dal sole", competing in the Big Artists section. During the second night of the show, a combination of televotes and journalists preferences among her entries determined "Bagnati del sole" as her song for the remaining part of the competition. "Bagnati dal sole" placed fifth in the final. Both songs were included in the album, and "Bagnati dal sole" was released as a single on 20 February 2014. 
"Don't Get Me Wrong", co-written by Dimitri Tikovoï, was released as the album's second single on 2 May 2014. Made in London'''s third and final single was "Se tu fossi qui", also included in the soundtrack of the film Ambo. 

Recorded in London, the album marked a departure from Noemi's previous work, with optimistic lyrics and a contemporary sound. Charlie Rapino served as the album's artistic producer. Made in London'''s artwork was developed by Paolo De Francesco, and its front cover shows a stamp representing a profile picture with Noemi's wearing a queen's crown.

Track listing

Charts

Weekly charts

Year-end charts

References

2014 albums
Noemi (singer) albums
Sony Music Italy albums
Italian-language albums